Luigi Borgato (born in Gallarate, February 21, 1963) is an Italian piano-maker craftsman of handcrafted grand pianos.

Master builder from Vicenza, Veneto, he improved and innovated technical aspects of piano making, which were later patented. In his capacity as master piano-maker he has been invited by Italian and foreign institutions to run courses on piano construction and technology.

Profile
In 1986, at the age of 23, he built his first piano.  In 1991, at the age of 28, he presented his first completely handmade concert-grand piano at the European congress ‘Europiano’.

Luigi Borgato personally selects the woods and chooses all the materials and components for the construction of his pianos. He is also a technician-tuner and fine-tunes his own instruments for concerts and recordings assisting internationally renowned pianists. The pianos he built have been appreciated by internationally renowned artists such as: Radu Lupu, András Schiff, Vladimir Ashkenazy, Rosalyn Tureck, Jerome Rose, Lazar Berman, Maria João Pires, Ingolf Wunder, Roberto Prosseda, Martin Berkofsky, Antonio Ballista, Bruno Canino, Michele Campanella, Roberto Giordano, Massimiliano Ferrati, Semion Balshem, Jean Guillou, Charlemagne Palestine, Cameron Carpenter, Johannes Skudlik, Giorgio Carnini, Francesco Libetta, Mirco Bruson

Patents

Luigi Borgato registered various patents. His first patent in 1991 provided the upper register of the keyboard with four strings struck per note in the 44 keys of the upper register and an innovative iron frame.

In 2000, he registered a second patent. Inspired by compositions written for pianos with pedalboards, he designed and built a new instrument called the Doppio Borgato, which is the first double concert-grand piano with pedalboard constructed in modern times.

In August 2017 he presents to the press his last creation; a new record in the category of "stage" concert grand pianos: the BORGATO GRAND PRIX 333, 3 meters and 33 cm long.

Notes

Bibliography
Larry E.Ashley, Pierce Piano Atlas, 12th edition, Larry E.Ashley Publisher, Albuquerque NM U.S.A., 2008, p. 58
Géreard Gefen, Piano, Editions du Chêne - Hachette Livre, 2002 p. 59, 166, 170, 180
Atanasio Cecchini, Piano Dream. History of the Piano, Mosè Editions, 2007 p. 170-171
Dario Miozzi, in Musica Rivista di cultura musicale e discografica, Zecchini Editions, December 2010 - January 2011 p. 54, 59-60
Alessandro Beltrami, Avvenire, 2010 Sunday August 15
Franco Pepe, in AreaArte, Summer 2010
Luca Segalla, in Musica, Rivista di cultura musicale e discografica, Zecchini Editions, March 2011 p. 28
Stuart Isacoff, on the book  A Natural History of the Piano, The Instrument, the Music, the Musicians—from Mozart to Modern Jazz and Everything in Between, edited by Alfred A. Knopf, New York 2011, p. 48

External links

  Official website

1963 births
Living people
People from Gallarate
Italian brands